William Owen may refer to:

Politicians
William Owen (Oxford MP) (c. 1540–1580), MP for Oxford
Sir William Owen (Shrewsbury MP), MP for Shrewsbury, 1625–1628
Sir William Owen, 4th Baronet (c. 1697–1781), British Member of Parliament for Pembroke and Pembrokeshire
William Mostyn Owen (1742–1795), British landowner and politician
William L. Owen (1809–1881), planter, businessman, and politician from Virginia
William Owen (Australian politician) (1815–1869), businessman and politician in South Australia, prominent Total Abstainer
William Owen (Wisconsin politician, born 1825) (1825–1894), member of the Wisconsin State Assembly
William D. Owen (1846–disappeared 1906), United States Representative from Indiana
William Reid Owen (1864–1949), mayor of Vancouver, British Columbia, 1924
William E. Owen (1888–1976), member of the Wisconsin State Senate and Wisconsin State Assembly
Will Owen (1901–1981), British politician

Sports
William Digby Owen (1857–1901), Oswestry F.C. and Wales international footballer
William O. Owen (1859–1947), who climbed the true summit of Grand Teton in 1898
William Pierce Owen (1860–1937), Ruthin Town F.C. and Wales international footballer
William Owen (footballer, born 1862) (1862–?), Chirk F.C. and Wales international footballer
William Owen (footballer, born 1884) (1884–1945), footballer who played for Stoke
William Owen (footballer, born 1906) (1906–?), English football goalkeeper with Birmingham, Fulham and Coventry City
Will Owen (cricketer) (born 1988), Welsh cricketer

Others
William Owen (priest) (died 1680), Welsh Anglican priest
William Owen (Royal Navy officer, born 1737) (1737–1778), British Royal Navy officer and settler of Campobello Island, Canada
William Owen (painter) (1769–1825), British portrait painter
William Fitzwilliam Owen (1774–1857), British Royal Navy vice-admiral and explorer
William Owen (composer) (1814–1893), Welsh composer of hymn tunes, including Bryn Calfaria
Sir William Owen (New South Wales judge)  (1834–1912), Justice of the Supreme Court of New South Wales
William Lancaster Owen (1843–1911), British civil engineer
William Owen (trade unionist) (1844–1912), English trade unionist, journalist and political activist
William Owen (architect) (1846–1910), English architect
William C. Owen (1854–1929), British–American anarchist, writer during the Mexican Revolution
Will Owen (illustrator) (1869–1957), English book illustrator, cartoonist, caricaturist and artist
William David Owen (1874–1925), Welsh novelist
Sir William Owen (judge) (1899–1972), Justice of the High Court of Australia, grandson of Sir William Owen of the Supreme Court of New South Wales
William T. Owen (1905–1942), Australian Army officer killed in action during World War II

See also
Bill Owen (disambiguation)
Will Owen (disambiguation)
William Owens (disambiguation)